Bombay Hospital a.k.a. BHMRC (Bombay Hospital And Medical Research Centre - Mumbai)  is a private hospital in Mumbai, India. It was founded in 1950 by R. D. Birla. It has 830 beds, 110 of which are in the critical care and recovery area. It has 22 operating theatres, 3,200 full-time employees, 240 eminent consultants and 200 resident doctors. In the R D Birla International Cardiac Centre associated with Bombay Hospital, there are 4 dedicated operation theatres, 2 cath labs where 1,800 surgeries and 4,000 angiographies/angioplasties are conducted each year. The department of neurosurgery and neurology also has 4 dedicated operation theatres. The department of orthopaedics has 5 dedicated operation theatres.

The departments include:

 Department of neurosurgery and neurology
 Department of orthopaedics
 Department of cancer
 Department of nephrology and urology
 Department of Imaging with facilities for CT scan, MRI besides other facilities

It is one of the oldest premiere private hospitals in Mumbai.

See also
Birla family
Rameshwar Das Birla

References

External links

Hospital buildings completed in 1950
Hospitals in Mumbai
Hospitals established in 1950
1950 establishments in Bombay State
20th-century architecture in India